Vyacheslav Petrovich Vedenin (1 October 1941 – 22 October 2021) was a Soviet cross-country skier. His silver medal over 50 km was the only medal won by a Soviet male skier at the 1968 Olympics, as his 4×10 km team placed fourth. At the next Olympics he was the Olympic flag bearer for the Soviet Union and won three medals, with golds in the 30 km and 4×10 km and a bronze in the 50 km. In the 4×10 km event Vedenin ran the last leg and won by 10 seconds, despite starting with a one-minute lag from Norway. His gold in the 30 km was the first individual win for a Soviet male skier at the Winter Olympics.

Vedenin also won three medals at the 1970 World Championships with two golds (30 km, 4x10 km) and one silver (50 km). After retiring from competitions he coached skiers at Dynamo Moscow, for which he competed through his entire career.

Vedenin was awarded the Order of the Red Banner of Labour (1970) and Order of Lenin (1972). Since 1989 a competition "Vedenin's Ski Track" is held yearly in Dubna, Dubensky District, in his honor.

Vedenin had two sons, Vyacheslav and Andrey. Vyacheslav is an international skiing referee who worked at the 2014 Winter Olympics and also took Olympic Oath on behalf of officials. Andrei is a former biathlon competitor.

References

External links

1941 births
2021 deaths
Sportspeople from Tula, Russia
Communist Party of the Soviet Union members
Honoured Masters of Sport of the USSR
Recipients of the Order of Lenin
Recipients of the Order of the Red Banner of Labour
Cross-country skiers at the 1968 Winter Olympics
Cross-country skiers at the 1972 Winter Olympics
Olympic bronze medalists for the Soviet Union
Olympic cross-country skiers of the Soviet Union
Olympic gold medalists for the Soviet Union
Olympic silver medalists for the Soviet Union
Soviet male cross-country skiers
Russian male cross-country skiers
Olympic medalists in cross-country skiing
FIS Nordic World Ski Championships medalists in cross-country skiing
Medalists at the 1972 Winter Olympics
Medalists at the 1968 Winter Olympics